Actually spelled "tycoon" during its brief usage in English language diplomatic notes in the 1860s,  is an archaic Japanese term of respect derived from Chinese I Ching, which once referred to an independent ruler who did not have an imperial lineage. Its literal meaning is "Great Lord/Prince" or "Supreme Commander". In the Edo period, this word was used as a diplomatic title designating the shōgun of Japan in relations with foreign countries, as an attempt to convey that in fact not the Japanese Emperor, but rather the shōgun was the point of call in relations with foreign countries.

For purposes of foreign relations, the term was first used by the Tokugawa shogunate in an attempt to extricate Japan from the Sino-centric system of relations. As formal language is extremely important in diplomacy, the connotations of most alternative terms were found to be inappropriate, and so taikun was chosen to best represent the shōgun in formal diplomatic communications.

Still going back 1,000 years and more in history,  of Japan and predecessors are said to have had the title (大和大君), read "Yamato Taikun".

The word has entered the English language as tycoon, where it has assumed the meaning of "a person of great wealth, influence or power". The term is notable as a Japanese word in English that comes from a different meaning in Japanese culture. Still, a "tycoon" is a person of great influence without formal title, whereas a "taikun" was a ruler without imperial lineage.

References

Edo period
Japanese honorifics
Titles of national or ethnic leadership